Juan Andrés Balanta Palacios (born 3 March 1997) is a Colombian footballer who plays for Portuguese club Torreense as a forward.

Career
On 2 July 2022, Balanta signed with Liga Portugal 2 club Torreense.

References

1997 births
Sportspeople from Cauca Department
Living people
Colombian footballers
Association football forwards
Deportivo Cali footballers
Cúcuta Deportivo footballers
Jaguares de Córdoba footballers
Tauro F.C. players
AD Oliveirense players
S.C.U. Torreense players
Categoría Primera A players
Categoría Primera B players
Liga Panameña de Fútbol players
Campeonato de Portugal (league) players
Liga Portugal 2 players
Colombian expatriate footballers
Expatriate footballers in Panama
Colombian expatriate sportspeople in Panama
Expatriate footballers in Portugal
Colombian expatriate sportspeople in Portugal